Luxembourg competed at the 1924 Summer Olympics in Paris, France.

Aquatics

Swimming

Ranks given are within the heat.

 Men

 Women

Athletics

Three athletes represented Luxembourg in 1924. It was the nation's third appearance in the sport as well as the Games.

Ranks given are within the heat.

Boxing 

Six boxers represented Luxembourg at the 1924 Games. It was the nation's debut in the sport. The team went a combined 0 for 6.

Cycling

Five cyclists represented Luxembourg in 1924. It was the nation's second appearance in the sport.

Road cycling

Track cycling

Ranks given are within the heat.

Football

Luxembourg competed in the Olympic football tournament for the second time in 1924.

 Round 1 Bye

 Round 2

Final rank 9th place

Gymnastics

Eight gymnasts represented Luxembourg in 1924. It was the nation's second appearance in the sport.

Artistic

Tennis

 Men

Weightlifting

Wrestling

Greco-Roman

 Men's

References
Official Olympic Reports

Nations at the 1924 Summer Olympics
1924
Olympics